Night of the Hunter may refer to:

Fiction
The Night of the Hunter (novel), a 1953 thriller novel by Davis Grubb
The Night of the Hunter (film), a 1955 adaptation by Charles Laughton, starring Robert Mitchum
Night of the Hunter, a 1991 TV movie adaption by David Greene, starring Richard Chamberlain
 Night of the Hunter, a 2014 Forgotten Realms novel

Music
"Night of the Hunter" (30 Seconds to Mars song), 2011
"Night of the Hunter (Remix)", a remixed version of the theme from the 1955 film, by Fantômas from their 2001 album The Director's Cut

See also
Night of Hunters, a 2011 album by Tori Amos
Night of Hunters tour, the concert tour in support of the 2011 album